John Divola (born 1949) is an American contemporary visual artist. He currently lives and works in Riverside, CA. Divola works in photography, describing himself as exploring the landscape by looking for the edge between the abstract and the specific.

Beginnings
Divola was born in 1949 in Los Angeles, CA. He received a B.A. from California State University, Northridge in 1971 and later received an M.F.A. from University of California, Los Angeles in 1974. He has held residencies at many institutions including California Institute of the Arts. He has held the position of Professor in the art department at University of California Riverside since 1988. His work has been featured in many solo exhibitions across United States, Europe, Japan and Australia. He participated in 1978, 1989, and 2000 Museum of Modern Art group exhibitions and in the 1981 Whitney Biennial. Divola received awards as Individual Artist Fellowship from the National Endowment for the Arts in 1973, 1976, 1979, 1990 and a Guggenheim Fellowship in 1986. He published four books: Continuity, Isolated Houses, Dogs Chasing My Car In The Desert, and Three Acts.

Works
In “Zuma” project, he has described being interested in the relation between real artworks and representations of them, and the issues of the natural and the artificial. Divola said "I attempted ... to develop a practice in which there could be no distinction between the document and the original." In his series of photographs from 1977, he used deserted houses on Zuma Beach and covered their walls in graffiti. He photographed the ocean from the house's interior through windows and cracks. Divola states: "On initially arriving I would move through the house looking for areas or situations to photograph. If nothing seemed to interest me I would move things around or do some spray painting. The painting was done in much the same way that one might doodle on a piece of paper. At that point I would return to the camera and explore what ever new potentials existed." These cyclical images skillfully juxtapose romantic skies and sunsets with a seaside structure that, frame by frame, deteriorates into ruin as it is vandalized by the artist and others who eventually set it on fire. Divola's works trace a schematic desire for escape, movement and transcendence.

"My acts, my painting, my photographing, my considering, are part of, not separate from, this process of evolution and change. These photographs are not so much about this process as they are remnants from it. My participation was not so much one of intellectual consideration as one of visceral involvement."

Dogs chasing my car in the desert are images of dogs in the desert captured in the midst of running wildly after the car. Emphasising the grain of the image, these black and white photographs capture a haunting moment in which there is a duality between a sense of absence and presence. The behaviour of the dogs suggest a lack of previous stimuli, a loneliness at the same time as an all-consuming reaction to the now, a presence. "It could be viewed as a visceral and kinetic dance. Here we have two vectors and velocities, that of a dog and that of a car and, seeing that a camera will never capture reality and that a dog will never catch a car, evidence of devotion to a hopeless enterprise".

In the "Dark Star" series, dark circles have been painted on the walls of an abandoned house. Creation and destruction are held in a delicate equilibrium, the white rooms of the house, are tattered and derelict. The domestic ruins suggest social collapse, secret renditions of something darkly sinister illuminating our conflicted recent history, updating "Zuma" and "Vandalism" for our age of foreclosure.

In the "As Far As I Can Get" project, he made photographs by pushing the self-timer button on his camera. An exposure is made in 10 seconds.

In other media
Divola's photograph Zuma was used as the cover art for Atlanta-based rock band Deerhunter's 2015 studio album Fading Frontier.

Publications
Gallery Min Catalog. 1987.
Continuity. Ram Publications, 1998. .
Isolated Houses. Tucson, AZ: Nazraeli, 2001. . With an introduction by Jan Tumlir. Edition of 1000 copies.
Dogs Chasing My Car in the Desert. Tucson, AZ: Nazraeli, 2004. .
Three Acts: Vandalism, Los Angeles International Airport Noise Abatement Zone (LAX NAZ), Zuma. New York City: Aperture, 2006. . With an essay by David Campany and an interview with Jan Tumlir.
Seven Dogs. One Picture Book 45. Portland, OR: Nazraeli, 2007. Edition of 500 copies. "A book of seven reproductions and one original color photograph.".
As far as I could get. Gothenburg, Sweden: Farewell, 2008. .
LAX NAZ: Los Angeles International Airport Noise Abatement Zone (Exterior Views), 1975. Part of Six by Six series, set 3. Nazraeli, 2012. The other volumes are by William Christenberry, Eduardo del Valle & Mirta Gómez, John Divola, LAX NAZ, Daido Moriyama, Karin Apollonia Müller, and Carrie Mae Weems.
Supermarket. One Picture Book 81. Portland, OR: Nazraeli, 2013. . Edition of 500 copies. "A book of 7 reproductions and one original photograph".
San Fernando Valley. NZ Library, set 1, v.2. Nazraeli, 2014. . Edition of 350 copies. There are 18 volumes in total by various authors.
Vandalism. Mack, 2018. .
Chroma. Jesi, Italy: Skinnerboox, 2020. . With a transcription of an interview between Divola and David Campany. Edition of 800 copies.
Terminus. London: Mack, 2021. .
Scapes. Skinnerboox, 2022. With an essay by David Campany. Edition of 750 copies.

Collections
Divola's work is held in the following public collections:
 Australian National Gallery, Canberra, Australia
 Berkeley Art Museum, University of California at Berkeley, Berkeley, CA
 Bibliotheque Nationale, Paris
 Carnegie Museum of Art, Pittsburgh, PA 
 Center for Creative Photography, University of Arizona, Tucson, AZ
 Art Institute of Chicago, Chicago: 13 prints (as of January 2021)
 Denver Art Museum, Denver
 Fogg Museum of Art, Harvard University, Cambridge, MA
 Fotomuseum Winterthur, Winterthur, Switzerland: 20 prints (as of January 2021)
 George Eastman Museum, Rochester, NY: 17 prints (as of January 2021)
 Hammer Museum, UCLA, Los Angeles, CA: 15 prints (as of January 2021)
 Henry Art Gallery, University of Washington, Seattle, Washington
 J. Paul Getty Museum, Los Angeles: 156 prints (as of January 2021)
 High Museum of Art, Atlanta
 Kiyosato Museum of Photographic Arts, Tokyo
 Los Angeles County Museum of Art, Los Angeles
 Metropolitan Museum of Art, New York
 Museum of Contemporary Art, Los Angeles
 Museum of Contemporary Photography, Chicago: 3 prints (as of January 2021)
 Museum of Fine Arts, Houston
 Museum of Modern Art, New York: 8 prints (as of January 2021)
 National Museum of American Art, Smithsonian Institution, Washington D.C.
 Philadelphia Museum of Art, Philadelphia
 San Francisco Museum of Modern Art, San Francisco: 8 prints and a series of 12 prints (as of January 2021)
 Santa Barbara Museum of Art, Santa Barbara
 Seattle Art Museum, Seattle
 Tokyo Metropolitan Museum, Tokyo
 Victoria and Albert Museum, London
 Whitney Museum of American Art, New York

References

External links

 Running from Camera blog
 PST: California Museum of Photography, L.A. Times
 Art review: 'The Long Range', L.A. Times, 2011.
 Aura of disaster permeates macabre art exhibit at UCLA, L.A. Times, 1997.

1949 births
Living people
Photographers from California
Artists from Los Angeles
University of California, Riverside faculty
University of California, Berkeley alumni
20th-century American photographers
21st-century American photographers